The Driver and Vehicle Standards Agency (DVSA) is an executive agency of the UK Department for Transport (DfT).

It carries out driving tests, approves people to be driving instructors and MOT testers, carries out tests to make sure lorries and buses are safe to drive, carries out roadside checks on drivers and vehicles, and monitors vehicle recalls. It is a separate organisation from the similarly named Driver and Vehicle Licensing Agency (DVLA).

The responsibilities of DVSA only cover Great Britain. In Northern Ireland, the same role is carried out by the Driver and Vehicle Agency (DVA).

History

It was announced on 20 June 2013 that the Driving Standards Agency (DSA) and Vehicle and Operator Services Agency (VOSA) would merge into a single agency in 2014. The name of the new agency was confirmed as the Driver and Vehicle Standards Agency (DVSA) on 28 November 2013.

DSA and VOSA closed on 31 March 2014, and DVSA took over their responsibilities on 1 April 2014.

DVSA was a trading fund from its creation until 31 March 2021.

Purpose and aims

DVSA's stated purpose is "helping you stay safe on Britain's roads". It does this by:

 helping people through a lifetime of safe driving
 helping people keep their vehicles safe to drive
 protecting people from unsafe drivers and vehicles

On 30 March 2017, DVSA published a strategy for 2017 to 2022 setting out how it would do this.

Responsibilities

DVSA is responsible for:

 setting the standard for safe and responsible driving and riding
 carrying out theory and practical driving tests for all types of motor vehicles
 maintaining the register of approved driving instructors
 approving training bodies and instructors to provide compulsory basic training and direct access scheme courses for motorcyclists
 running the tests that allow people to join and stay on the voluntary register of driver trainers who train drivers of car and van fleets
 setting the standards for the drink-drive rehabilitation scheme, running the scheme and approving the courses that offenders can take
 conducting annual testing of lorries, buses and trailers through authorised testing facilities (ATFs) and goods vehicle testing stations (GVTS)
 conducting routine and targeted checks on vehicles, drivers and operators ensuring compliance with road safety legislation and environmental standards
 supervising the MOT scheme so that over 20,000 authorised garages carry out MOT tests to the correct standards
 providing administrative support to the Traffic commissioners in considering and processing applications for licenses to operate lorries, buses, coaches and   registered bus services
 conducting post-collision investigations
 monitoring products for manufacturing or design defects, highlighting safety concerns and monitoring safety recalls
 providing a range of educational and advisory activities to promote road safety

Enforcement Examiners

The DVSA appoints Vehicle Examiners to stop and check vehicles for defects and compliance. They wear uniform, which consists of a shirt and tie/polo shirt, high visibility coat, trousers, boots and a white-topped cap with a green and white chequered cap band (similar to police traffic officers).

Powers
Under the Police Reform Act 2002, section 41 and Schedule 5, Chief Constables could grant powers (under a Community Safety Accreditation Scheme) to - formerly VOSA and now DVSA - officers to stop vehicles, for checks on vehicle and driver compliance without the need for police support (later expanded to stop any vehicle, although mainly goods and passenger carrying vehicles). At that time, only police officers had the power to stop vehicles and therefore had to be present. The powers were piloted in 2003 and brought more widely into force in 2004.

Following a consultation in July 2010, the law was overhauled in 2011 to grant VOSA/DVSA officers the power to stop vehicles without relying on police approval through Community Safety Accreditation Schemes as above. This also allowed VOSA/DVSA officers to stop vehicles in Scotland, as well as in England and Wales as previously. The amendment, which was made by the Road Vehicles (Powers to Stop) Regulations 2011, allows "stopping officers" approved by the Department for Transport to stop vehicles for certain reasons.

To be appointed as a stopping officer, a person must:

be a suitable person to exercise the powers of a stopping officer,
be capable of effectively exercising their powers, and
have received adequate training for the exercise of their powers.
Officers must be in uniform to stop vehicles. Impersonating or obstructing stopping officers is an offence.

See also
 Driving examiner (United Kingdom)
 Driver and Vehicle Licensing Agency (DVLA)
 Highways England

References

External links
 

Road transport in the United Kingdom
Executive agencies of the United Kingdom government
Trading funds of the United Kingdom government
Department for Transport
Driving in the United Kingdom
2014 establishments in the United Kingdom